Lake Michie is a reservoir in central North Carolina, within the Neuse River watershed. The lake is located in northern Durham County near the town of Bahama. Fed principally by the Flat River, Lake Michie is the primary reservoir for the city of Durham.  The reservoir dam was completed in 1926.

In addition to retaining drinking water for the city, the concrete and earthwork dam, built between 1924 and 1926, supplied hydroelectric power to Durham until 1960, when the generators were removed.

Recreational area 
Lake Michie has Largemouth Bass. Boat rentals are available. Other fish found in the lake include Bull Catfish, Mud Catfish, Channel Catfish, Flathead Catfish, Blue Catfish, Chain Pikerel, Longnose Gar, and various others.

Expansion

2007 drought
By March 2008 Lake Michie was once again filled to overflowing, thanks to above average rainfall.

References

External links
 Durham water status page, showing lake levels, inflow and outflow.
 Durham parks and recreation page on Lake Michie
 Panoramic video of Lake Michie during extreme drought conditions in 2002.
 Photo during the 2007 drought.

Michie
Protected areas of Durham County, North Carolina
Research Triangle
Bodies of water of Durham County, North Carolina